Paul Kevin Turner (June 12, 1969 – March 24, 2016) was a professional American football fullback. He played eight seasons in the National Football League (NFL) for the New England Patriots and Philadelphia Eagles. Turner died after a multi-year battle with amyotrophic lateral sclerosis (ALS), which had been triggered by chronic traumatic encephalopathy (CTE).

Career
Turner attended Prattville High School in Prattville, Alabama. Playing for the school's gridiron football team, Turner was a member of the 1984 Alabama state champions. He enrolled at the University of Alabama, where he played college football for the Alabama Crimson Tide. With the Crimson Tide, Turner was regarded as a strong blocker, supporting running backs Siran Stacy and Bobby Humphrey.

The New England Patriots of the National Football League (NFL) selected him in the third round of the 1992 NFL draft. Turner played for New England for three seasons, and then played for five seasons with the Philadelphia Eagles. Turner missed the majority of the 1995 season due to a knee injury. When he came back the following year, he blocked for Ricky Watters, who led the NFL in rushing yards. Turner won the Ed Block Courage Award for his persistence through the injury. He experienced two neck injuries in 1999, which ended his career. He finished his NFL career with 635 rushing yards (4.0 yards per carry), 236 receptions for 2,015 yards, and 10 touchdowns.

Personal life
Turner and his first wife, Joyce Labbe of Auburn, Maine, had three children: Nolan, Natalie, and Cole. They divorced and Turner married his nurse, Allison Sanford, in 2014. , Turner's son Nolan is a college football player for the Clemson Tigers football team. Clemson head coach Dabo Swinney was a teammate of Turner's in college.

Health issues
In June 2010, Turner was diagnosed with chronic traumatic encephalopathy (CTE), and agreed to donate his brain and spinal cord when he died. Turner served as a lead plaintiff in a major lawsuit filed by former players against the NFL regarding the health risks of concussions in American football.

Turner's life with Amyotrophic Lateral Sclerosis (ALS) was documented in the music video for the song "Journey On" by Ty Herndon. Turner and his two children appeared in the music video along with Herndon. In 2012, Jon Frankel of HBO worked with Turner to create the documentary film American Man, describing Turner's life, especially his battle with ALS.

On March 24, 2016, Turner died in his home in Vestavia Hills, Alabama. On November 3 of that year, Boston University Brain CTE Center announced that Turner had a severe case of chronic traumatic encephalopathy, which led to his death.  Multiple news outlets reported that CTE killed Turner, not ALS.

The following day, the Boston University School of Medicine posted on its Facebook Page, "The VA-BU-CLF Brain Bank issued the following statement: To clarify conflicting media reports, #KevinTurner died of #ALS. ALS is a clinical diagnosis defined by the loss of movement through the degeneration of motor neuron cells. There are many known causes of ALS, specifically genetic and environmental causes, but most ALS cases are of idiopathic, or unknown, origin. By studying his brain, researchers at the VA, Boston University School of Medicine and Concussion Legacy Foundation discovered that the cause of Kevin Turner’s ALS was motor neuron cell death triggered by CTE, which is a pathological diagnosis. His clinical diagnosis remains ALS."

References

Further reading

External links
 

1969 births
2016 deaths
People from Prattville, Alabama
Players of American football from Alabama
American football fullbacks
American football players with chronic traumatic encephalopathy
Philadelphia Eagles players
New England Patriots players
Alabama Crimson Tide football players
Deaths from motor neuron disease
Neurological disease deaths in Alabama
Ed Block Courage Award recipients